U3 small nucleolar RNA-associated protein 6 homolog is a protein that in humans is encoded by the UTP6 gene.

See also

 Fibrillarin
 Small nucleolar RNA U3
 RCL1
 RRP9
 UTP11L
 UTP14A
 UTP15

References

Further reading